Yingcheng Subdistrict is a subdistrict in Jiutai District, Changchun, Jilin, China. , it administers Yingcheng Community, Limin Community, Xinghua Community, Huoshiling Village, and Yingcheng Village.

See also 
 List of township-level divisions of Jilin

References 

Township-level divisions of Jilin
Changchun